The 3 arrondissements of the Isère department are:
 Arrondissement of Grenoble, (prefecture of the Isère department: Grenoble) with 263 communes. The population of the arrondissement was 738,149 in 2016.
 Arrondissement of La Tour-du-Pin, (subprefecture: La Tour-du-Pin) with 136 communes. The population of the arrondissement was 302,380 in 2016.
 Arrondissement of Vienne, (subprefecture: Vienne) with 113 communes. The population of the arrondissement was 212,383 in 2016.

History

In 1800 the arrondissements of Grenoble, Saint-Marcellin, La Tour-du-Pin and Vienne were established. The arrondissement of Saint-Marcellin was disbanded in 1926. 

The borders of the arrondissements of Isère were modified in January 2017:
 24 communes from the arrondissement of Grenoble to the arrondissement of Vienne
 one commune from the arrondissement of La Tour-du-Pin to the arrondissement of Vienne
 six communes from the arrondissement of Vienne to the arrondissement of La Tour-du-Pin

References

Isere